Marina Ciucur is a Romanian sprint canoer who competed in the late 1980s. She won a bronze medal in the K-4 500 m event at the 1986 ICF Canoe Sprint World Championships in Montreal.

References

Living people
Romanian female canoeists
Year of birth missing (living people)
ICF Canoe Sprint World Championships medalists in kayak